Andreas Axel Janota Wilson (born 7 March 1981) is a Swedish actor who played the leading role in the Oscar-nominated (for best foreign movie) Evil. He has also starred in Kill Your Darlings, Babas bilar and Den utvalde. He was named as one of European films' "Shooting Stars" by the European Film Promotion in 2004. He has been modeling for the clothing store Abercrombie & Fitch.

Selected filmography
 The Veil of Twilight (2014)
 Real Humans (TV-series, 2012)
 Sebastians Verden (2010)
 Bicycle Bride (2010)
 Stone's War (2008)
 Colorado Avenue (2007)
 Kill Your Darlings (2006)
 Babas bilar (2006)
 Animal (2005)
 Den utvalde (2005)
 Evil (2003)

References

External links
 

1981 births
Living people
Male actors from Stockholm
Swedish male film actors
Swedish male television actors
Swedish male models
21st-century Swedish male actors